The green-headed tanager (Tangara seledon) is a brightly colored bird found in the Atlantic forest in south-eastern Brazil, far eastern Paraguay, and far north-eastern Argentina (Misiones only).

As other members of the genus Tangara, it is a small colorful bird, measuring an average of 13.5 centimeters (5.3 in) and a mass of 18g (0.6 oz). The green-headed Tanager has a greenish or bluish head, black on the back, and a contrastingly colored, orange or red rump. Females and juvenile birds have similar, though duller coloration. While essentially a bird of humid forests, it is also common in orchards and parks, where it moves through the canopy, making itself inconspicuous, as its apparently flashy blue-green coloration camouflages it well amongst the foliage.

References

 

Tangara (genus)
Birds of the Atlantic Forest
Birds described in 1776
Taxa named by Philipp Ludwig Statius Müller